The Sacred Heart Cathedral (formally the Cathedral of the Sacred Heart of Jesus, sometimes also known as the Polish Church) is a religious building belonging to the Roman Catholic Church and is located in the street Sadiq Asimov, Tashkent, east of Uzbekistan.

This is a relatively new structure that was built in the early twentieth century. It is decorated with stained glass windows, small towers on the roof and an arched doorway . It has a living room and a library, named in honor of Pope John Paul II .

See also

Roman Catholic Church
Sacred Heart Cathedral (disambiguation)

References

Churches in Tashkent
Roman Catholic cathedrals in Uzbekistan
Buildings and structures in Tashkent
Tourist attractions in Tashkent